Alex Sandunga (born November 26, 1976) is a rapper, actor and producer, who is known for his eclectic musical career which is always in experimentation and movement. He is currently living in Helsinki, Finland. In 1997 he founded Alto Voltage NAE, an electric and alive rap group that was known by its strong opinions. He became a member of the Asociación Hermanos Saíz, which supports young artists, i.e. musicians and songwriters. In the association, he became an activist of a hip hop movement and used rather daring lyrics while describing issues such as oppression, racism issues and agony of the people of Cuba.

Co-operation and touring

While touring around Cuba with Alto Voltaje NAE and performing on television as well, Sandunga got connected with more people in the music industry. In 2004, the band made a three-month tour in Finland, which also became the country he settled in during 2005.

During the past years Sandunga, apart from his own music, has been working in co-operation with various kind of artists, such as a Finnish rapper Mariska. He has visited many festivals (Habana-Hip Hop, Cubadisco, Raumanmeren Juhannus, Koneisto Koneisto, Pori Jazz, Faces Festival, Maailma kylässä, Kontufest, Urb Festival, Sound Dance, Poesía y Rap) in Cuba, Finland, Estonia and Spain (Canary Islands) and shared stages with artists like Mos Def, The Roots and Tony Touch. Sandunga is working on his new album now.

Discography

Studio album 

 2015: Alex Sandunga
 2009: Sin Freno

EP 
 2012: Quiero Quiero

Singles 

 2009: "A Mi Me Gusta"
 2011: "Quiero Quiero"
 2013: "Déjala"
 2013: "Mundo de Prisa"

Collaborations 

 2014: "Mi Chica Canela (Marquita)" feat Juno & J. Karjalainen
 2014: "Gardens" feat Tuigu
 2014: "Bospor Dilara" feat Tuigu
 2011: "Ella No Quiere Saber Na" feat Soul Back
 2010: "Karnaval" feat Orkasmo
 2006: "Grita Con Migo" feat Mariska
 2005: "Mucha Carga" feat Gee & Mista
 2004: "La Pipa De Lague" feat Alto Voltaje
 2002: "Hasta Cuando Es Esto" feat Miki Flow
 2001: "Abreme Tu Puerta" feat Payo Malo, Dilema

References

External links
 Alex Sandunga on MySpace
 Alex Sandunga at Reverb Nation

1976 births
Cuban rappers
Living people
21st-century Cuban male  singers
21st-century Cuban musicians